The IX South American Games (Spanish: Juegos Sudamericanos; Portuguese: Jogos Sul-Americanos) was a multi-sport event held between 19 and 30 March 2010 in Medellín, Colombia. The Games were organized by the South American Sports Organization (ODESUR), who awarded the Games to the city with 8 votes over the bid by previous host Santiago, Chile (6 votes).

Participating nations

 (hosts)

Medal count 
The medal count for these games is tabulated below. This table is sorted by the number of gold medals earned by each country.  The number of silver medals is taken into consideration next, and then the number of bronze medals.

Sports 

  Archery (28)
  Athletics (44)
  Badminton (6)
  Baseball (1)
  Basketball (2)
  Beach volleyball (2)
  Bowling (15)
  Boxing (14)
  Canoeing (24)
  Cycling (28)
  Diving (9)
  Equestrian (7)
  Fencing (12)
  Football (1)
  Futsal (1)
  Gymnastics (23)
  Handball (2)
  Judo (22)
  Karate (18)
   Roller skating (32)
  Rowing (14)
  Sailing (6)
  Shooting (34)
  Softball (1)
  Squash (7)
  Swimming (44)
  Synchronized swimming (3)
  Table tennis (7)
  Taekwondo (16)
  Tennis (5)
  Triathlon (8)
  Volleyball (2)
  Water polo (2)
  Waterskiing (10)
  Weightlifting (15)
  Wrestling (20)

References

External links 

 Official website

 
South American Games
South American Games
South American Games
South American
Multi-sport events in Colombia
Sport in Medellín
South American Games
March 2010 sports events in South America